Maria Penelope Katharine Aitken (born 12 September 1945) is an English theatre director, teacher, actress, and writer.

Early life and career
Aitken was born in Dublin, Ireland, the daughter of Sir William Aitken, a Conservative MP, and Penelope Aitken, whose father was John Maffey, 1st Baron Rugby. Her grandfather was the UK Representative to Ireland (1939–49). She is a great-niece of newspaper magnate and war-time minister Lord Beaverbrook, and sister to former Conservative cabinet minister Jonathan Aitken. She attended Riddlesworth Hall Preparatory School in Norfolk, Sherborne School for Girls in Dorset and St Anne's College, Oxford, where she graduated with a degree in English Language and Literature.

She has directed several plays in the West End and on Broadway. Her production of The 39 Steps, which ran in London for nine years, also played three years on Broadway and won Olivier and Tony Awards. In 2011, she directed Frank Langella in Man and Boy on Broadway. She is a Visiting Lecturer at Yale, NYU and Juilliard drama schools. Her extensive acting career includes leading roles at the Royal National Theatre, the Royal Shakespeare Company and in the West End. She has played more Noël Coward leads than any other actress. Her film career includes appearances in Doctor Faustus (1967), Mary, Queen of Scots (1971), Half Moon Street (1986), A Fish Called Wanda (1988) (for which she was nominated for a BAFTA award), The Fool (1990), The Grotesque (1995), Fierce Creatures (1997), Jinnah (1998) and Asylum (2005).

In 1984 she co-wrote and starred in the sitcom Poor Little Rich Girls alongside Jill Bennett.

She is the author of A Girdle Round the Earth, a story of some of the more remarkable women travellers of the last 200 years, and Style: Acting in High Comedy, published in 1996, which contends that "High comedies are not bloodless, refined, wordy plays — their themes are sex, money and social advancement. They contain a splendid contradiction: wit and elegance at the service of man's basest drives."

Personal life
Aitken is the mother of actor Jack Davenport, born during her marriage to Nigel Davenport from 1972 to 1981. She was married to Richard Durden from 1968 to 1971. Since 1991, she has been married to the novelist Patrick McGrath and they live together in New York and London. She has been a patron of the British Thyroid Foundation since 1992, and was appointed a Trustee of the Noël Coward Foundation in 2012.

References

External links
 

1945 births
Living people
Aitken family
Alumni of St Anne's College, Oxford
English film actresses
English stage actresses
English television actresses
People educated at Sherborne Girls
Women theatre directors
English people of Canadian descent